Flinn Springs is an unincorporated community in the East County region of San Diego County, California.

History
Flinn Springs is named for early settler James Ebenezer Flinn, a native of Missouri who moved to the area and established a farm prior to 1874. Sometimes Flinn's father, Dr. William E. Flinn, is credited as the founder of Flinn Springs instead. The settlement was also known as "La Viñita" (Spanish for "the little vineyard") because the Flinns made and sold wine at their farm.

Geography
Flinn Springs straddles Interstate 8, which runs from east to west through the region. U.S. Route 80 passed through Flinn Springs from 1926 until the route was decommissioned in California in 1964. The historic highway continues to serve as the community's main thoroughfare.

Flinn Springs neighbors Lakeside to the west, Harbison Canyon to the south, and Alpine to the east. The community sits at an elevation of 1,063 feet.

References

Unincorporated communities in San Diego County, California
El Cajon, California
Unincorporated communities in California